1967 riots  may refer to:

 Long, hot summer of 1967, marked by race riots and civil disorder throughout the United States
 Avondale riots of 1967, June 12–18, Cincinnati, Ohio
 Buffalo riot of 1967, June 27–July 1, Buffalo, New York
 1967 Newark riots, July 12–17, Newark, New Jersey
 1967 Plainfield riots, July 14–21, Plainfield, Jersey
 Cairo riot, July 17–20, Cairo, Illinois
 1967 Detroit riot, July 23–28, Detroit, Michigan
 Cambridge riot of 1967, July 24, Cambridge, Maryland
 1967 Saginaw riot, July 26, Saginaw, Michigan
 1967 Milwaukee riots, July 30–August 3, Milwaukee, Wisconsin
 1967 Philadelphia student demonstration, November 17, Philadelphia, Pennsylvania
 Hong Kong 1967 leftist riots, May–August, British Hong Kong